Barbara Winifred Wright (13 October 1915 – 3 March 2009) was an English translator of modern French literature.

Early life
Wright was born on 13 October 1915 in Worthing, West Sussex. After attending Godolphin School in Salisbury, she studied to be a pianist at the Royal College of Music in London and trained under Alfred Cortot in Paris. Wright taught at Dora Russell's Beacon Hill School from 1936 to 1937. In 1938 she married Walter Hubbard, a kinsman of the Barons Addington – the couple had a daughter in 1944, before separating in 1957. 

Though she never formally studied as a translator, Wright believed that her work as an accompanist helped her capture the rhythm of text. Her first major translation was Alfred Jarry's Ubu Roi, published in 1951 by Gaberbocchus Press.

Translator
Wright specialised in the translation of poetic prose and drama with a focus on French surrealist and existential writing. While working on a translation, she immersed herself in the world of the author. Reading other texts by the writer, conferring with francophones about French idioms and, where possible, forging relationships with the authors were all aspects of her process. Over the course of her career Wright worked closely with, and befriended, Raymond Queneau, Robert Pinget and Nathalie Sarraute. In addition to her translations, Wright authored literary criticism and was a regular contributor to the Times Literary Supplement as a reviewer.

After completing translations of two short stories by Queneau, the author proposed that Wright translate his Exercices de style. The work had been deemed 'untranslatable' due to Queneau's reliance on unique French writing styles and language. Trusting her skill, Queneau encouraged and endorsed Wright's improvised English equivalents of French turns of phrase. The result was a resounding success with her text becoming the basis for translations of the work in other languages. In 2008 it was recognised as one of the best translations during a 50-year period by the Society of Authors.

In 1953 Wright was elected a member of the College of Pataphysics, as Régente de Zozologie Shakespearienne. She was elevated to Satrape in 2001, a position she held alongside Umberto Eco and Jean Baudrillard. In 1986 Wright was appointed Commandeur of l'Ordre des Arts et des Lettres. She was also a two-time recipient of the Scott Moncrieff Prize. Wright was recognised in 1987 for her translation of Pierre Albert-Birot's Grabinoulor and again in 1992 for Michel Tournier's The Midnight Love Feast.

After separating from her husband, Wright lived at Hampstead in north London, and died on 3 March 2009. Her literary translation papers are held by the Lilly Library at Indiana University. The authors she translated who are represented in the collection include Jean Hamburger, Eugène Ionesco, Alfred Jarry, Pierre Lauer, Robert Pinget, Raymond Queneau, Nathalie Sarraute and Stefan Themerson. Correspondence from publishers of Wright's works, including Gaberbocchus Press, John Calder, Doubleday, Faber & Faber, New Directions, the Atlas Press and Red Dust, are also present.

Translations
From Renouard & Kelly below.

Stefan Themerson & Franciszka Themerson: (translated from Polish with Stefan Themerson)  Mr Rouse Builds His House. 1950
Alfred Jarry: Ubu Roi (illustrated by Franciszka Themerson). 1951.
Raymond Queneau: The Trojan Horse; At the Edge of the forest. 1954.
Christian Dietrich Grabbe: Comedy, Satire. Irony and Deeper Meaning (translation from German, illustrated by Franciszka Themerson). 1955.
Pol-Dives: The Song of Bright Misery. 1955.
Raymond Queneau: Exercises in Style. 1958.
Raymond Queneau: Zazie in the Metro. 1960.
Monique Lange: The Catfish in New Writers 1. 1960.
Fernando Arrabal: Orison; The Two Executioners; Fernando and Lis; The Car Cemetery in Plays. vol. 1 1962.
Andrée Martinerie: Second Spring. 1962.
Alain Robbe-Grillet: Snapshots and Towards a New Novel. 1965.
Marguerite Duras:  The Long Absence. 1966.
Raymond Queneau: Between Blue and Blue. 1967.
Fernando Arrabal: Guernica; The Labyrinth; The Tricycle; Picnic on the Battlefield; The Condemned Man's Tricycle in  Plays. vol. 2. 1967.
Raymond Queneau: A Blue Funk and Dino in French Writing Today. 1968.
Alain Robbe-Grillet: In the Corridors of the Underground in French Writing Today. 1968.
Raymond Queneau: The Bark Tree. 1968.
Alain Robbe-Grillet: The Secret Room in The Penguin Book of French Short Stories. 1968.
André Couteaux: Portrait of the Boy as a Young Wolf/My Father's Keeper. 1968.
Alfred Jarry: The Supermale. 1968.
: The Swallows. 1969
: The House of Bones. 1971.
Jean Genet (with Terry Hands): The Balcony. 1971.
Pierre Lauer: The Suns of Badarane. 1971.
Robert Pinget: The Libera Me Domine. 1972
Raymond Queneau: The Flight of Icarus. 1973.
Yves Klein: Selected Writings. (in part). 1974
Robert Pinget: Recurrent Melody. 1975.
Ludovic Janvier: The Bathing Girl (revision of translation by John Matthew). 1976
Raymond Queneau: The Sunday of Life. 1976.
Sylvia Bourdon: Love is a Feast. 1977.
Tristan Tzara: Seven Dada Manifestoes and Lampisteries. 1977.
Robert Pinget: Passacaglia. 1978.
Roland Topor: Leonardo Was Right. 1978
Herbert Le Porrier: The Doctor From Cordoba. 1979.
Simone Benmussa: The Singular Life of Albert Nobbs. 1979
Robert Pinget: Fable. 1980.
Nathalie Sarraute: It is There and other plays. 1980
Simone Benmussa: 'Appearances' in Gambit No. 35. 1980
Muriel Cerf: 'Blitz-Fortune' in Real Life – Writers from Nine Countries Illuminate the Life of the Modern Woman. 1981
Raymond Queneau: We Always Treat Women Too Well. 1981
Robert Pinget: Between Fantoine and Agapa. 1982.
Robert Pinget: That Voice. 1982.
Nathalie Sarraute: The Use of Speech. 1982
Nathalie Sarraute: Childhood. 1983
Romain Gary: King Solomon. 1983
Michel Tournier: The Fetishist and Other Stories. 1983
Robert Pinget: Someone. 1984.
Henri Guigonnat: Daemon in Lithuania. 1985
Eugène Ionesco: Journeys Among the Dead. 1985
René de Obaldia: Monsieur Klebs and Rosalie in Plays Vol. 4. 1985
Michel Tournier: A Garden at Hammamet. 1986
Robert Pinget: The Apocrypha. 1986.
Pierre Albert-Birot: The First Book of Grabinoulor.1986
Robert Pinget: Abel and Bela.. 1987.
Michel Tournier: The Golden Droplet. 1987
Raymond Queneau: Pierrot Mon Ami. 1987.
Robert Pinget: Monsieur Songe with The Harness, Plough. 1988.
Robert Pinget: A Bizarre Will. 1989.
Elisabeth Badinter: The Unopposite Sex [Man/Woman: The One is the Other]. 1989
Raymond Queneau: The Last Days. 1990.
Raymond Queneau: Alfred in Journal of Literary Translation. vol. XXIII. 1990
Liliane Siegel: In the Shadow of Sartre. 1990
Nathalie Sarraute: You Don't Love Yourself. 1990
Robert Pinget: The Enemy. 1991.
Michel Tournier: Totems. 1991
Michel Tournier: The Midnight Love Feast. 1991
Pascal Quignard: Georges de La Tour. 1991
Jean Genet (with Terry Hands): The Balcony. 1991
Patrick Modiano: Honeymoon. 1992
Jean Hamburger: The Diary of William Harvey. 1992
Robert Pinget: Be Brave. 1994.
Robert Pinget: Theo, or The New Era. 1994.
Alberto Giacometti: The Dream, The Sphinx and The Death of T. in Grand Street in Space No. 54. 1995
Coline Serrau: Lapin, Lapin. 1995
Samuel Beckett: Eleutheria. 1996
Jean Rouaud: Of Illustrious Men. 1996
Nathalie Sarraute: Here. 1997
Jean Rouaud: The World, More or Less. 1997
Stefan Themerson: Fragments From Darkness. 1998
Robert Pinget: Traces of Ink. 1998.
Aude Yung-de Prévaud: Jacques & Lotha. 2000
Simone Benmussa: Three Plays. (The Singular Life of Albert Nobbs, Appearance and The Death of Ivan Illich) in collaboration with Donald Watson 2000
Raymond Queneau: Five Stories: Panic; Dino; At the Edge of the Forest; A Blue Funk; The Trojan Horse. 2000.
Pierre Albert-Birot: 31 Pocket Poems. 2003
Raymond Queneau: Introduction and comments with extracts from Zazie, Pierrot, and The Flight of Icarus, in "Tolling Elves 5" February 2003 to celebrate Queneau's centenary.
Robert Pinget: Trio (Between Fatoine and Agapa, That Voice, Passacaglia). 2005.
publication of script for radio adaptation of Exercises in Style broadcast on 25 December 1959 by the BBC with introduction by Barbara Wright. 2006.
Robert Pinget: Film script: 15 Rue des Lilas. in Renouard & Kelly. 2013

Wright also wrote various plays, libretti (three by Mozart), artists' manifestos, composers' programme notes, introductions, forewords and postscripts.

References

External links

Finding aid to Barbara Wright's papers at Lilly Library, Indiana University, Bloomington.
Wright-ing the Untranslable, introduction to Barbara Wright's papers at Lilly Library, Indiana University, Bloomington.

1915 births
2009 deaths
People from Worthing
People from Hampstead
Commandeurs of the Ordre des Arts et des Lettres
English translators
20th-century British translators
French–English translators